The Wilsonville Spokesman is the local weekly newspaper in Wilsonville, Oregon, United States. Started in 1983 in the southern suburb of Portland, Oregon, the publication has a circulation of approximately 3,500. Published on Wednesdays, the paper is owned by Pamplin Media Group, which owns other local newspapers in Oregon such as The Newberg Graphic and The Canby Herald.

History
The newspaper was founded in 1983 by Thomas Russ Dillon. In 2003, the newspaper won two awards from the Oregon Newspaper Publishers Association. That year an opinion piece printed in the paper was part of a lawsuit by a city employee against the city council relating to protected speech under the First Amendment to the United States Constitution. In 2006, the paper took two second and two third place awards for newspapers in their category from the local chapter of the Society of Professional Journalists. As of 2008, the Spokesman had a circulation of nearly 3,500. In January 2013, the paper was sold to the Pamplin Media Group along with five other papers owned by Eagle Newspapers.

References

External links

Wilsonville, Oregon
1983 establishments in Oregon
Newspapers published by Pamplin Media Group
Oregon Newspaper Publishers Association
Publications established in 1983
Newspapers published in Oregon